Majdoor ('Worker') is a daily newspaper published from Bhaktapur, Nepal. It is an organ of the Nepal Workers Peasants Party. As of 2012 Bishnu Gopal K.C. was the chief editor of the newspaper. Surendra Raj Gosain is the present editor of Majdoor

References

Newspapers published in Nepal
Nepali-language newspapers
Communist newspapers
1975 establishments in Nepal